Constantina (c. 560 – c. 605) was the Empress consort of Maurice of the Byzantine Empire. She was a daughter of Tiberius II Constantine and Ino Anastasia. Her parentage was recorded in the chronicles of Theophylact Simocatta, Paul the Deacon and John of Biclaro.

The Georgian Chronicle identifies Constantina as a daughter of Khosrau II. However the Chronicle was compiled in the 13th century and so the contradictory parentage is considered a mistake. Other later accounts make Constantina his mother in law through her - most likely fictional - daughter Miriam/Maria.

Caesar's daughter
Her father Tiberius was Comes Excubitorum (Commander of the Excubitors) under Justin II. Justin reportedly suffered from temporary fits of insanity and was unable to perform his duties as early as the fall of Dara to Khosrau I of the Sassanid Empire in November 573. According to Gregory of Tours, sole power of the Empire at this point was assumed by Sophia, a niece of Theodora and Empress consort of Justin II. Evagrius Scholasticus reports that Sophia managed to conclude a three-year truce with Khosrau by her own. But as a regent she would require supporters and she picked Tiberius as her colleague in power.

According to the chronicle of Theophanes the Confessor, Tiberius was officially appointed Caesar by Justin on 7 December 574. He was also adopted by Justin and thus became his appointed heir. At this point Ino emerged as Caesarissa, the second-ranking lady in the Empire, and Constantina and her sister Charito became members of the imperial family.

The Ecclesiastic history of John of Ephesus and the chronicle of Theophanes both consider Sophia planning to marry Tiberius herself. His current marriage seen as an offense to her. Ino and her daughters were not allowed to enter the Great Palace of Constantinople and were instead settled in the palace of Hormisdas, residence of Justinian I prior to his elevation to the throne. According to John of Ephesus, Tiberius joined them every evening and returned to the Great Palace every morning. Sophia also refused to let the ladies at court visit Ino and her daughters as a token of respect to them.

Ino eventually left Constantinople in favor of Daphnudium, her previous residence. According to John of Ephesus, Tiberius left Constantinople to visit Ino when she fell sick. Her daughters are assumed to have joined her in her departure from the capital.

Imperial daughter
In September 578 Justin II appointed Tiberius as his co-emperor. On 5 October 578 Justin was dead and Tiberius became the sole Emperor. According to John of Ephesus, Sophia sent Patriarch Eutychius of Constantinople to Tiberius to convince him to divorce Ino. Offering both herself and her adult daughter Arabia as prospective brides for the new Emperor. Tiberius refused.

Tiberius apparently feared for the safety of his wife and daughters. John of Ephesus reports the three women secretly smuggled into Constantinople by boat, late at night. Ino was proclaimed Empress in a public ceremony and received the rank of Augusta. Sophia also retained her rank and continued to hold a section of the palace to herself. Constantina had now become one of two imperial daughters.

The reign of her father as Emperor was relatively short. In 582 Tiberius fell ill and the matter of succession became urgent. As before, Sophia was asked to choose a successor for the dying Emperor and chose Maurice, a general who had accomplished a number of victories over Hormizd IV, son and successor of Khosrau I. According to Gregory of Tours, she was planning to marry the new imperial heir.

Marriage
John of Ephesus and Gregory of Tours both present the marriages of Constantina and Charito as Tiberius outmaneuvering Sophia in securing the loyalties of his sons-in-law. On August 5, 582, Constantina was betrothed to Maurice and Charito to Germanus. Both men were named Caesars and became likely successors.

Germanus was a patrician and governor of Africa Province. He is tentatively identified with the posthumous son of Germanus Justinus and Matasuntha mentioned by Jordanes. Matasuntha was a daughter of Amalasuntha and Eutharic. Eutharic is given by Jordanes as a son of Vetericus, grandson of Berimud and great-grandson of Thorismund.

A historical interpretation for the dual marriage was that Tiberius intended to appoint two co-emperors as his successors. Possibly with a division of provinces between them. Whether there were such plans, they never took form. According to John of Nikiû, Germanus was Tiberius' favored candidate for the throne but declined out of humility.

On 13 August Tiberius was already on his deathbed and civilian, military and ecclesiastical dignitaries awaited the appointment of his successor. Tiberius had reportedly prepared a speech on the matter but at this point was too weak to speak. The quaestor sacri palatii read it for him. The speech proclaimed Maurice an Augustus and sole successor to the throne. On 14 August Tiberius died and Maurice became sole emperor. Constantina remained his betrothed.

Empress
The marriage of Constantina and Maurice took place in autumn 582. The ceremony was performed by Patriarch John IV and is described in detail by Theophylact Simocatta. The bridal attendant was the eunuch Margarites. Constantina was proclaimed an Augusta while both Sophia and Anastasia also kept the same title. John of Ephesus mentions all three Augustas residing in the Great Palace.

Anastasia was the first of the three ladies to die. Theophanes places her death in 593. Constantina seems to have enjoyed better relations with Sophia than her mother did. Theophanes records them to have jointly offered a precious crown as an Easter present to Maurice in 601. He accepted their gift but then ordered it hang over the altar of Hagia Sophia as his own tribute to the church, which according to Theophanes was taken an insult by both Augustas and caused a rift in the marriage.

Deposition
On 22 November 602, Maurice, Constantina and their children left Constantinople in a warship. Citywide riots had started due to a famine, the Green chariot racing club had turned against them and a mutinous army under Phocas had arrived outside the gates. Phocas was proclaimed an emperor on 23 November.

The warship faced a winter storm at sea and sought refuge at the Asian coast of the Sea of Marmara, not far from Nicomedia. Maurice suffered from arthritis and was incapacitated by severe pain after his flight at sea. Troops loyal to Phocas captured the deposed imperial family days later and brought them to Chalcedon. On 27 November, all five sons were executed before the eyes of their father. Then Maurice himself was executed. Constantina survived as a widow.

In 603, Constantina and her three daughters were exiled to a monastery, known as "House of Leo". The monastery has been tentatively identified with the Monastery of St. Mamas, founded and run by their relative Theoctista, a sister of Maurice.

Theophanes records that Constantina maintained contact with Germanus,  and that both were conspiring against Phocas. Their messages were entrusted to Petronia, a maidservant under Constantina. Petronia proved disloyal and reported the conspiracy to Phocas. Constantina was arrested and placed in the custody of Theopemptus, prefect of Constantinople. Her interrogation included torture and she was forced to give the name of her fellow conspirators.

Constantina and all three of her daughters were executed at Chalcedon. Germanus and an unnamed daughter of his were also executed. The daughter had been the widow of Theodosius. Theophanes places the deaths in 605/606 but the exact date is in doubt.

The Patria of Constantinople, attributed to George Codinus, mentions Constantina was decapitated and her corpse thrown in the Bosporus; however, De Ceremoniis by Constantine VII mentions Maurice, Constantina and their children buried at the monastery of St. Mamas.

Family and children 
The marriage was fertile and produced nine known children:
Theodosius (4 August 583/585 – after 27 November 602). According to John of Ephesus, he was the first heir born to a reigning emperor since the reign of Theodosius II (408–450). He was appointed Caesar in 587 and co-emperor on 26 March 590.
Tiberius (d. 27 November 602).
Petrus (d. 27 November 602).
Paulus (d. 27 November 602).
Justin (d. 27 November 602).
Justinian (d. 27 November 602).
Anastasia (d. c. 605).
Theoctista (d. c. 605).
Cleopatra (d. c. 605).

A daughter Miriam/Maria is recorded by the 12th-century chronicler Michael the Syrian as married to Khosrau II, but her existence is most likely fictional as she is not mentioned by any Byzantine source. If real, she would have been born soon after Constantina's marriage to Maurice in 582.

References

Sources
 
 
 Continuité des élites à Byzance durante les siècles obscurs. Les princes caucasiens et l'Empire du VIe au IXe siècle, 2006

External links
 -The listing of her mother in the Prosopography of the Later Roman Empire
 -The page of "Maurice and his historian" dealing with her marriage
 

560s births
600s deaths
Justinian dynasty
Executed royalty
Executed Byzantine people
People executed by decapitation
7th-century executions by the Byzantine Empire
Augustae
Daughters of Byzantine emperors
6th-century Byzantine empresses
7th-century Byzantine empresses